A four-dimensional space (4D) is a mathematical extension of the concept of three-dimensional space (3D). Three-dimensional space is the simplest possible abstraction of the observation that one only needs three numbers, called dimensions, to describe the sizes or locations of objects in the everyday world.

The idea of adding a fourth dimension began with Jean le Rond d'Alembert's "Dimensions" being published in 1754, was followed by Joseph-Louis Lagrange in the mid-1700s, and culminated in a precise formalization of the concept in 1854 by Bernhard Riemann. In 1880, Charles Howard Hinton popularized these insights in an essay titled "What is the Fourth Dimension?", which explained the concept of a "four-dimensional cube" with a step-by-step generalization of the properties of lines, squares, and cubes. The simplest form of Hinton's method is to draw two ordinary 3D cubes in 2D space, one encompassing the other, separated by an "unseen" distance, and then draw lines between their equivalent vertices. This can be seen in the accompanying animation whenever it shows a smaller inner cube inside a larger outer cube. The eight lines connecting the vertices of the two cubes in this case represent a single direction in the "unseen" fourth dimension.

Higher-dimensional spaces (i.e., greater than three) have since become one of the foundations for formally expressing modern mathematics and physics. Large parts of these topics could not exist in their current forms without using such spaces. Einstein's concept of spacetime uses such a 4D space, though it has a Minkowski structure that is slightly more complicated than Euclidean 4D space.

It is only when such locations are linked together into more complicated shapes that the full richness and geometric complexity of higher-dimensional spaces emerge. A hint of that complexity can be seen in the accompanying 2D animation of one of the simplest possible 4D objects, the tesseract (equivalent to the 3D cube; see also hypercube).

History
Lagrange wrote in his  (published 1788, based on work done around 1755) that mechanics can be viewed as operating in a four-dimensional space— three dimensions of space, and one of time. In 1827, Möbius realized that a fourth dimension would allow a three-dimensional form to be rotated onto its mirror-image; by 1853, Ludwig Schläfli had discovered all the regular polytopes that exist in higher dimensions, including the four-dimensional analogs of the Platonic solids, but his work was not published until after his death. Higher dimensions were soon put on a firm footing by Bernhard Riemann's 1854 thesis, in which he considered a "point" to be any sequence of coordinates . The possibility of geometry in higher dimensions, including four dimensions in particular, was thus established.

An arithmetic of four dimensions, called quaternions, was defined by William Rowan Hamilton in 1843. This associative algebra was the source of the science of vector analysis in three dimensions as recounted in A History of Vector Analysis. Soon after, tessarines and coquaternions were introduced as other four-dimensional algebras over R.

One of the first major expositors of the fourth dimension was Charles Howard Hinton, starting in 1880 with his essay What is the Fourth Dimension?, published in the Dublin University magazine. He coined the terms tesseract, ana and kata in his book A New Era of Thought and introduced a method for visualizing the fourth dimension using cubes in the book Fourth Dimension.

Hinton's ideas inspired a fantasy about a "Church of the Fourth Dimension" featured by Martin Gardner in his January 1962 "Mathematical Games column" in Scientific American. In 1886, Victor Schlegel described his method of visualizing four-dimensional objects with Schlegel diagrams.

In 1908, Hermann Minkowski presented a paper consolidating the role of time as the fourth dimension of spacetime, the basis for Einstein's theories of special and general relativity. But the geometry of spacetime, being non-Euclidean, is profoundly different from that explored by Schläfli and popularised by Hinton. The study of Minkowski space required new mathematics quite different from that of four-dimensional Euclidean space, and so developed along quite different lines. This separation was less clear in the popular imagination, with works of fiction and philosophy blurring the distinction, so in 1973 H. S. M. Coxeter felt compelled to write:

Vectors
Mathematically, a four-dimensional space is a space with four spatial dimensions, that is a space that needs four parameters to specify a point in it. For example, a general point might have position vector , equal to
 
This can be written in terms of the four standard basis vectors , given by

so the general vector  is
 
Vectors add, subtract and scale as in three dimensions.

The dot product of Euclidean three-dimensional space generalizes to four dimensions as
 
It can be used to calculate the norm or length of a vector,

and calculate or define the angle between two non-zero vectors as

Minkowski spacetime is four-dimensional space with geometry defined by a non-degenerate pairing different from the dot product:
 
This leads to many of the well-known apparent "paradoxes" of relativity.

The cross product is not defined in four dimensions. Instead, the exterior product is used for some applications, and is defined as follows:
 
This is bivector valued, with bivectors in four dimensions forming a six-dimensional linear space with basis . They can be used to generate rotations in four dimensions.

Orthogonality and vocabulary
The six cardinal directions in this space can be called up, down, east, west, north, and south. Positions along these axes can be called altitude, longitude, and latitude. Lengths measured along these axes can be called height, width, and depth.

Comparatively, four-dimensional space has an extra coordinate axis, orthogonal to the other three, which is usually labeled . To describe the two additional cardinal directions, Charles Howard Hinton coined the terms ana and kata, from the Greek words meaning "up toward" and "down from", respectively. 

As mentioned above, Hermann Minkowski exploited the idea of four dimensions to discuss cosmology including the finite velocity of light. In appending a time dimension to three-dimensional space, he specified an alternative perpendicularity, hyperbolic orthogonality. This notion provides his four-dimensional space with a modified simultaneity appropriate to electromagnetic relations in his cosmos. Minkowski's world overcame problems associated with the traditional absolute space and time cosmology previously used in a universe of three space dimensions and one time dimension.

Geometry

The geometry of four-dimensional space is much more complex than that of three-dimensional space, due to the extra degree of freedom.

Just as in three dimensions there are polyhedra made of two dimensional polygons, in four dimensions there are polychora made of polyhedra. In three dimensions, there are 5 regular polyhedra known as the Platonic solids. In four dimensions, there are 6 convex regular 4-polytopes, the analogs of the Platonic solids. Relaxing the conditions for regularity generates a further 58 convex uniform 4-polytopes, analogous to the 13 semi-regular Archimedean solids in three dimensions. Relaxing the conditions for convexity generates a further 10 nonconvex regular 4-polytopes.

In three dimensions, a circle may be extruded to form a cylinder. In four dimensions, there are several different cylinder-like objects. A sphere may be extruded to obtain a spherical cylinder (a cylinder with spherical "caps", known as a spherinder), and a cylinder may be extruded to obtain a cylindrical prism (a cubinder). The Cartesian product of two circles may be taken to obtain a duocylinder. All three can "roll" in four-dimensional space, each with its properties.

In three dimensions, curves can form knots but surfaces cannot (unless they are self-intersecting). In four dimensions, however, knots made using curves can be trivially untied by displacing them in the fourth direction—but 2D surfaces can form non-trivial, non-self-intersecting knots in 4D space. Because these surfaces are two-dimensional, they can form much more complex knots than strings in 3D space can. The Klein bottle is an example of such a knotted surface. Another such surface is the real projective plane.

Hypersphere

The set of points in Euclidean 4-space having the same distance  from a fixed point  forms a hypersurface known as a 3-sphere. The hyper-volume of the enclosed space is:

 

This is part of the Friedmann–Lemaître–Robertson–Walker metric in General relativity where  is substituted by function  with  meaning the cosmological age of the universe. Growing or shrinking  with time means expanding or collapsing universe, depending on the mass density inside.

Four-dimensional perception in humans 
Research using virtual reality finds that humans, despite living in a three-dimensional world, can, without special practice, make spatial judgments about line segments embedded in four-dimensional space, based on their length (one-dimensional) and the angle (two-dimensional) between them. The researchers noted that "the participants in our study had minimal practice in these tasks, and it remains an open question whether it is possible to obtain more sustainable, definitive, and richer 4D representations with increased perceptual experience in 4D virtual environments". In another study, the ability of humans to orient themselves in 2D, 3D, and 4D mazes has been tested. Each maze consisted of four path segments of random length and connected with orthogonal random bends, but without branches or loops (i.e. actually labyrinths). The graphical interface was based on John McIntosh's free 4D Maze game. The participating persons had to navigate through the path and finally estimate the linear direction back to the starting point. The researchers found that some of the participants were able to mentally integrate their path after some practice in 4D (the lower-dimensional cases were for comparison and for the participants to learn the method).

However, a 2020 review underlined how these studies are composed of a small subject sample and mainly of college students. It also pointed out other issues that future research has to resolve: elimination of artifacts (these could be caused, for example, by strategies to resolve the required task that don't use 4D representation/4D reasoning and feedback given by researchers to speed up the adaptation process) and analysis on inter-subject variability (if 4D perception is possible, its acquisition could be limited to a subset of humans, to a specific critical period, or to people's attention or motivation). Furthermore, it is needed to determine if there is a more appropriate way to project the 4-dimension (because there are no restrictions on how the 4-dimension can be projected). Researchers also hypothesized that human acquisition of 4D perception could result in the activation of brain visual areas and entorhinal cortex. If so they suggest that it could be used as a strong indicator of 4D space perception acquisition. Authors also suggested using a variety of different neural network architectures (with different a priori assumptions) to understand which ones are or are not able to learn.

Dimensional analogy

To understand the nature of four-dimensional space, a device called dimensional analogy is commonly employed. Dimensional analogy is the study of how dimensions relate to  dimensions, and then inferring how  dimensions would relate to  dimensions.

The dimensional analogy was used by Edwin Abbott Abbott  in the book Flatland, which narrates a story about a square that lives in a two-dimensional world, like the surface of a piece of paper. From the perspective of this square, a three-dimensional being has seemingly god-like powers, such as ability to remove objects from a safe without breaking it open (by moving them across the third dimension), to see everything that from the two-dimensional perspective is enclosed behind walls, and to remain completely invisible by standing a few inches away in the third dimension.

By applying dimensional analogy, one can infer that a four-dimensional being would be capable of similar feats from the three-dimensional perspective. Rudy Rucker illustrates this in his novel Spaceland, in which the protagonist encounters four-dimensional beings who demonstrate such powers.

Cross-sections
As a three-dimensional object passes through a two-dimensional plane, two-dimensional beings in this plane would only observe a cross-section of the three-dimensional object within this plane. For example, if a sphere passed through a sheet of paper, beings in the paper would see first a single point. A circle gradually grows larger, until it reaches the diameter of the sphere, and then gets smaller again, until it shrinks to a point and disappears. The 2D beings would not see a circle in the same way as three-dimensional beings do; rather, they only see a one-dimensional projection of the circle on their 1D "retina". Similarly, if a four-dimensional object passed through a three-dimensional (hyper) surface, one could observe a three-dimensional cross-section of the four-dimensional object. For example, a hypersphere would appear first as a point, then as a growing sphere (until it reaches the "hyperdiameter" of the hypersphere), with the sphere then shrinking to a single point and then disappearing. This means of visualizing aspects of the fourth dimension was used in the novel Flatland and also in several works of Charles Howard Hinton. And, in the same way, three-dimensional beings (such as humans with a 2D retina) can see all the sides and the insides of a 2D shape simultaneously, a 4D being could see all faces and the inside of a 3D shape at once with their 3D retina.

Projections
A useful application of dimensional analogy in visualizing higher dimensions is in projection. A projection is a way of representing an n-dimensional object in  dimensions. For instance, computer screens are two-dimensional, and all the photographs of three-dimensional people, places, and things are represented in two dimensions by projecting the objects onto a flat surface. By doing this, the dimension orthogonal to the screen (depth) is removed and replaced with indirect information. The retina of the eye is also a two-dimensional array of receptors but the brain can perceive the nature of three-dimensional objects by inference from indirect information (such as shading, foreshortening, binocular vision, etc.). Artists often use perspective to give an illusion of three-dimensional depth to two-dimensional pictures. The shadow, cast by a fictitious grid model of a rotating tesseract on a plane surface, as shown in the figures, is also the result of projections.

Similarly, objects in the fourth dimension can be mathematically projected to the familiar three dimensions, where they can be more conveniently examined. In this case, the 'retina' of the four-dimensional eye is a three-dimensional array of receptors. A hypothetical being with such an eye would perceive the nature of four-dimensional objects by inferring four-dimensional depth from indirect information in the three-dimensional images in its retina.

The perspective projection of three-dimensional objects into the retina of the eye introduces artifacts such as foreshortening, which the brain interprets as depth in the third dimension. In the same way, perspective projection from four dimensions produces similar foreshortening effects. By applying dimensional analogy, one may infer four-dimensional "depth" from these effects.

As an illustration of this principle, the following sequence of images compares various views of the three-dimensional cube with analogous projections of the four-dimensional tesseract into three-dimensional space.

Shadows
A concept closely related to projection is the casting of shadows.

If a light is shone on a three-dimensional object, a two-dimensional shadow is cast. By dimensional analogy, light shone on a two-dimensional object in a two-dimensional world would cast a one-dimensional shadow, and light on a one-dimensional object in a one-dimensional world would cast a zero-dimensional shadow, that is, a point of non-light. Going the other way, one may infer that light shining on a four-dimensional object in a four-dimensional world would cast a three-dimensional shadow.

If the wireframe of a cube is lit from above, the resulting shadow on a flat two-dimensional surface is a square within a square with the corresponding corners connected. Similarly, if the wireframe of a tesseract were lit from "above" (in the fourth dimension), its shadow would be that of a three-dimensional cube within another three-dimensional cube suspended in midair (a "flat" surface from a four-dimensional perspective). (Note that, technically, the visual representation shown here is a two-dimensional image of the three-dimensional shadow of the four-dimensional wireframe figure.)

Bounding volumes
The dimensional analogy also helps in inferring basic properties of objects in higher dimensions. For example, two-dimensional objects are bounded by one-dimensional boundaries: a square is bounded by four edges. Three-dimensional objects are bounded by two-dimensional surfaces: a cube is bounded by 6 square faces. By applying dimensional analogy, one may infer that a four-dimensional cube, known as a tesseract, is bounded by three-dimensional volumes. And indeed, this is the case: mathematics shows that the tesseract is bounded by 8 cubes. Knowing this is key to understanding how to interpret a three-dimensional projection of the tesseract. The boundaries of the tesseract project to volumes in the image, not merely two-dimensional surfaces.

Visual scope
People have a spatial self-perception as beings in a three-dimensional space, but are visually restricted to one dimension less: the eye sees the world as a projection to two dimensions, on the surface of the retina. Assuming a four-dimensional being were able to see the world in projections to a hypersurface, also just one dimension less, i.e., to three dimensions, it would be able to see, e.g., all six faces of an opaque box simultaneously, and in fact, what is inside the box at the same time, just as people can see all four sides and simultaneously the interior of a rectangle on a piece of paper. The being would be able to discern all points in a 3-dimensional subspace simultaneously, including the inner structure of solid 3-dimensional objects, things obscured from human viewpoints in three dimensions on two-dimensional projections. Brains receive images in two dimensions and use reasoning to help picture three-dimensional objects.

Limitations
Reasoning by analogy from familiar lower dimensions can be an excellent intuitive guide, but care must be exercised not to accept results that are not more rigorously tested. For example, consider the formulas for the area enclosed by a circle in two dimensions and the volume enclosed by a sphere in three dimensions. The volume in all dimensions is computable from a recurrence relation connecting dimension  to dimension .

In culture

In art

In literature

Science fiction texts often mention the concept of "dimension" when referring to parallel or alternate universes or other imagined planes of existence. This usage is derived from the idea that to travel to parallel/alternate universes/planes of existence one must travel in a direction/dimension besides the standard ones. In effect, the other universes/planes are just a small distance away from our own, but the distance is in a fourth (or higher) spatial (or non-spatial) dimension, not the standard ones.

One of the most heralded science fiction stories regarding true geometric dimensionality, and often recommended as a starting point for those just starting to investigate such matters, is the 1884 novella Flatland by Edwin A. Abbott. Isaac Asimov, in his foreword to the Signet Classics 1984 edition, described Flatland as "The best introduction one can find into the manner of perceiving dimensions."

The idea of other dimensions was incorporated into many early science fiction stories, appearing prominently, for example, in Miles J. Breuer's The Appendix and the Spectacles (1928) and Murray Leinster's The Fifth-Dimension Catapult (1931); and appeared irregularly in science fiction by the 1940s. Classic stories involving other dimensions include Robert A. Heinlein's —And He Built a Crooked House (1941), in which a California architect designs a house based on a three-dimensional projection of a tesseract; Alan E. Nourse's Tiger by the Tail and The Universe Between (both 1951); and The Ifth of Oofth (1957) by Walter Tevis. Another reference is Madeleine L'Engle's novel A Wrinkle In Time (1962), which uses the fifth dimension as a way of "tesseracting the universe" or "folding" space to move across it quickly. The fourth and fifth dimensions are also key components of the book The Boy Who Reversed Himself by William Sleator.

In philosophy 

Immanuel Kant, in 1783, wrote: "That everywhere space (which is not itself the boundary of another space) has three dimensions and that space, in general, cannot have more dimensions is based on the proposition that not more than three lines can intersect at right angles in one point. This proposition cannot at all be shown from concepts, but rests immediately on intuition and indeed on pure intuition a priori because it is apodictically (demonstrably) certain."

"Space has Four Dimensions" is a short story published in 1846 by German philosopher and experimental psychologist Gustav Fechner under the pseudonym "Dr. Mises". The protagonist in the tale is a shadow who is aware of and able to communicate with other shadows, but who is trapped on a two-dimensional surface. According to Fechner, this "shadow-man" would conceive of the third dimension as being one of time. The story bears a strong similarity to the "Allegory of the Cave" presented in Plato's The Republic ( 380 BC).

Simon Newcomb wrote an article for the Bulletin of the American Mathematical Society in 1898 entitled "The Philosophy of Hyperspace". Linda Dalrymple Henderson coined the term "hyperspace philosophy", used to describe writing that uses higher dimensions to explore metaphysical themes, in her 1983 thesis about the fourth dimension in early-twentieth-century art. Examples of "hyperspace philosophers" include Charles Howard Hinton, the first writer, in 1888, to use the word "tesseract"; and the Russian esotericist P. D. Ouspensky.

See also

4-polytope
4-manifold
Exotic R4
Four-dimensionalism
List of four-dimensional games
Eugene the Jeep
Time in physics
Spacetime

References

Further reading
 
 Andrew Forsyth (1930) Geometry of Four Dimensions, link from Internet Archive.
  Extract of page 68
 E. H. Neville (1921) The Fourth Dimension, Cambridge University Press, link from University of Michigan Historical Math Collection.

External links

"Dimensions" videos, showing several different ways to visualize four-dimensional objects
Science News article summarizing the "Dimensions" videos, with clips
Flatland: a Romance of Many Dimensions (second edition)
Frame-by-frame animations of 4D - 3D analogies

Dimension
 
Multi-dimensional geometry
Special relativity
4 (number)